The Shanghan Lun (variously known in English as the Treatise on Cold Damage Diseases, Treatise on Cold Damage Disorders or the Treatise on Cold Injury) is a part of Shanghan Zabing Lun (.  It is a Traditional Chinese medicine treatise that was compiled by Zhang Zhongjing sometime before 220 AD, at the end of the Han dynasty. It is amongst the oldest complete clinical textbooks in the world (cf. Carakasaṃhitā and the Hippocratic Corpus). It is considered one of the four canonical works of Traditional Chinese medicine, along with Huang Di Nei Jing, Jin Gui Yao Lue, and Wen Bing Xue.

Surviving editions 

  Song dynasty edition. Collated by scholastic ministers Gao Baohen, Lin Yi, and Sun Qi under the order of the emperor and published in 1065 AD. Reprinted in the Ming dynasty.
 Cheng Wuji's Annotated Treatise on Cold Damage. Extensively read in Japan and China, was widely circulated in Cheng's time. However, many transcriptions and re-transcriptions have stirred up disagreement as to whether it is true to the original.
 Classic of the Golden Chamber and Jade Sheath. This book has the same content as the Song edition with other minor variations in context.
 Kang Ping edition. Kang Ping is the name of the period from 1058 to 1068 AD in the Kōhei era in Japan. It is indispensable for study because it retained the ancient style of typesetting dated back to the era at the end of the Han dynasty.

The Song edition is organized into ten volumes including the first two chapters on pulse diagnosis; Cheng's edition is also organized into ten volumes but simplified; Classic of the Golden Chamber and Jade Sheath is organized into eight volumes.

Contents
The Shanghan Lun has 398 sections with 113 herbal prescriptions, organised into the Six Divisions corresponding to the six stages of disease:

Tai Yang (greater yang): a milder stage with external symptoms of chills, fevers, stiffness, and headache. Therapy: sweating.
Yang ming (yang brightness): a more severe internal excess yang condition with fever without chills, distended abdomen, and constipation. Therapy: cooling and eliminating.
Shao yang (lesser yang): half exterior, half interior half excess and half deficiency with chest discomfort, alternating chills, and fever. Therapy: harmonizing.
Tai yin (greater yin): chills, distended abdomen with occasional pain. Therapy: warming with supplementing.
Shao yin (lesser yin): weak pulse, anxiety, drowsiness, diarrhea, chills, cold extremities. Therapy: warming with supplementing.
Jue yin (reverting yin/absolute yin): thirst, difficult urination, physical collapse. Therapy: warming with supplementing.

See also
 Chinese herbology
 Chinese patent medicine
 Six levels
 Traditional Chinese Medicine
 Jingui Yaolüe, another surviving part of Shanghan Zabing Lun

References

Chinese medical texts
Han dynasty texts
3rd-century books